Racial transformation is the process by which a demographic region (e.g., a country, neighborhood, or a school) changes in racial composition.

See also
Them: A Novel
 Transracial (identity)

References

Race and society
Gentrification
Urbanization